OSS 77 – Operazione fior di loto (Operation Lotus Flower) is a 1965 Italian Eurospy spy film directed by Bruno Paolinelli.

Cast
Dominique Boschero
Gaia Germani
Sandro Moretti	(as Robert Kent)
Yoko Tani
Jean-Louis Trista

External links
 

1965 films
1960s Italian-language films
Italian spy thriller films
Films directed by Bruno Paolinelli
Films scored by Luis Bacalov
1960s spy thriller films
1960s Italian films